Miloslav Ransdorf (15 February 1953 – 22 January 2016) was a Czech politician and Member of the European Parliament for the Communist Party of Bohemia and Moravia, part of the European United Left–Nordic Green Left party group in the European Parliament. He died in office at Prague in 2016.

Controversies
In 2013, Ransdorf was videotaped by Dutch newsblog Geenstijl, checking in at the European Parliament to claim 304 euro daily expenses fee and immediately leaving. When confronted, Ransdorf became engaged in a physical altercation with the reporter.

In 2015, Ransdorf was detained in Zurich, Switzerland, with three men from Slovakia, after attempting to withdraw 350 million euros at the Zurich Cantonal Bank with false IDs.

Ransdorf was involved in four car accidents, which led to speculation about drunk driving.

References

External links

1953 births
2016 deaths
Communist Party of Bohemia and Moravia MEPs
MEPs for the Czech Republic 2004–2009
MEPs for the Czech Republic 2009–2014
MEPs for the Czech Republic 2014–2019
People from Rakovník
Charles University alumni